According to a 2009 Pew Research Center report, Muslims constitute approximately 0.1% of the population in Saint Lucia.

Demographics
The majority of Muslims in the country is made up of local African descent converts and also immigrants from Middle East and South Asia.

References

Saint Lucia 
Saint Lucia
Religion in Saint Lucia